Qasr-e Ahmad (also Romanized as Qaşr-e Aḩmad and Qasr Ahmad; also known as Kasr Aḩmad) is a village in Kavar Rural District, in the Central District of Kavar County, Fars Province, Iran. At the 2006 census, its population was 2,303, in 527 families.

References 

Populated places in Kavar County